Piero Filippone (1911–1998) was an Italian art director who designed the sets for around two hundred films. He created the sets for Roberto Rossellini's 1954 film Journey to Italy.

Selected filmography
 Three Cornered Hat (1935)
 The Lady in White (1938)
 For Men Only (1938)
 We Were Seven Widows (1939)
 Defendant, Stand Up! (1939)
 The Pirate's Dream (1940)
 Then We'll Get a Divorce (1940)
 Big Shoes (1940)
 Marco Visconti (1941)
 Bluebeard (1941)
 Seven Years of Good Luck (1942)
 I Live as I Please (1942)
 Happy Days (1942)
 Seven Years of Happiness (1943)
 Anything for a Song (1943)
 Lively Teresa (1943)
 Assunta Spina (1948)
 The Elusive Twelve (1950)
 The Merry Widower (1950)
 The Ungrateful Heart (1951)
 Four Red Roses (1951)
 Lieutenant Giorgio (1952)
 Frontier Wolf (1952)
 Deceit (1952)
 Brothers of Italy (1952)
 Sunday Heroes (1952)
 The Ship of Condemned Women (1953)
 The Daughter of the Regiment (1953)
 Journey to Italy (1954)
 The Friend of the Jaguar (1959)
 The Sign of the Coyote (1963)

References

Bibliography 
 Peter Brunette. Roberto Rossellini. University of California Press, 1996.

External links 
 

1911 births
1998 deaths
Italian art directors
Film people from Naples
Italian emigrants to the United States